Kostiantyn Kovalenko (born 5 December 1986) is a Ukrainian football defender who plays for FC Obolon-Brovar Kyiv.

Career
Kovalenko is a product of the Obolon Kyiv sportive school systems "Zmina".

He spent his career as a player in a lower Ukrainian football leagues. In March 2014 he signed a contract with the Obolon's phoenix club FC Obolon-Brovar in the Ukrainian First League.

Personal life

References

External links
 
 

Ukrainian footballers
Association football defenders
1986 births
Living people
FC Obolon-Brovar Kyiv players
FC Obolon-2 Kyiv players
FC Arsenal-Kyivshchyna Bila Tserkva players
FC Stal Kamianske players
Ukraine youth international footballers